Beach volleyball was introduced at the Asian Games in the 1998 edition and has been held at every edition since.

Summary

Men

Women

Medal table

Participating nations

Men

Women

References

Medalists Men
Medalists Women

 
Sports at the Asian Games
Asian Games
Asian Games